Coaches and media of the Summit League bestow the following individual awards at the end of each college soccer season.

Player of the Year 
 1984: Albert Adade, Cleveland State
 1985: Larry Pretto, Eastern Illinois
 1986: Ken Dugan, Western Illinois
 1987: Ted Eck, Western Illinois
 1988: Garry Laidlaw, Eastern Illinois
 1989: Nick Stavrou, Cleveland State
 1990: Nick Stavrou, Cleveland State
 1991: Ken Pryor, Akron
 1992: Tim Dunne, Green Bay
 1993: Tony Sanneh, Milwaukee
 1994: Everton Barrington, Central Connecticut
 1995: Steve Jarvis, Central Connecticut
 1996: Mike Anderson, UMKC
 1997: Greg Simmonds, Howard
 1998: J. J. Ruane, Valparaiso
 1999: Erik Kuster, UMKC
 2000: Troy Markin, Western Illinois
 2001: Larry Scheller, UMKC
 2002: Philip Braathen, Oakland

Offensive Player of the Year 
 2003: Trey Vaut, Oral Roberts
 2004: Dave Leung, Oral Roberts
 2005: Dave Leung, Oral Roberts
 2006: Matt Wieclaw, Western Illinois
 2007: Vangel Nacovski, IUPUI
 2008: Brian Harris, UMKC
 2009: Bryan Pérez, UMKC
 2010: John Bayron Sosa, UMKC
 2011: Max Touloute, Purdue Fort Wayne
 2012: Kyle Bethel, Oakland
 2013: Zach Bolden, Denver
 2014: Johnny Chavez, Oral Roberts
 2015: Drew Whalen, Western Illinois
 2016: Fazlo Alihodzic, Omaha
 2017: Andre Shinyashiki, Denver
 2018: Andre Shinyashiki, Denver
 2019: Tanguy Guerineau, Oral Roberts
 2020: Dante Brigida, Oral Roberts

Defensive Player of the Year 
 2003: Jason Perry, Oakland
 2004: Jeff Wiese, Oakland
 2005: Jeff Wiese, Oakland
 2006: Stephen Paterson, Western Illinois
 2007: Ian Daniel, Oakland
 2008: Steve Clark, Oakland
 2009: Mitch Hildebrandt, Oakland
 2010: Brian Quintana, UMKC
 2011: Charlie Bales, Western Illinois
 2012: John Timm, Oakland
 2013: Theodor Remman, Denver
 2014: Charlie Bales, Western Illinois
 2015: Reagan Dunk, Denver
 2016: Reagan Dunk, Denver
 2017: Scott DeVoss, Denver
 2018: Scott DeVoss, Denver
 2019: Paul Kirdorf, Western Illinois
 2020: Fitzroy Cummings, Omaha

Goalkeeper of the Year 
 2012: Eduardo Cortes, IUPUI
 2013: Oliver Brown, Denver
 2014: Yves Dietrich, Western Illinois
 2015: Dan Jackson, Denver
 2016: Nick Gardner, Denver
 2017: Mike Novotny, Eastern Illinois
 2018: Will Palmquist, Denver
 2019: Miles Motakef, Oral Roberts
 2020: Cooper Clark, Kansas City

Newcomer of the Year 
 1992: Tim Dunne, Green Bay
 1993: Brad McTighe, Eastern Illinois
 1994: Joe House, Quincy
 1995: David Gee, SIU Edwardsville
 1996: Mike Lawrence, Howard
 1997: Steve Butcher, Buffalo
 1998: Scott Daly, Valparaiso
 1999: Brandon Gibbs, UMKC
 2000: Justin Langan, Western Illinois
 2001: Sun Potter, Oral Roberts
 2002: Jeff Wiese, Oakland
 2003: Miguel Menduina, Oral Roberts
 2004: Vangel Nacovski, IUPUI
 2005: Carlos Pinto, Oral Roberts
 2006: Martin Browne, Jr., Western Illinois
 2007: Martin Sandell, Oakland
 2008: Tom Catalano, Oakland
 2009: David Sarabia, UMKC
 2010: Jeff Keyler, IUPUI
 2011: Jordan Rideout, UMKC
 2012: Kyle Bethel, Oakland
 2013: Christian Garcia, Omaha
 2014: Uriel Macias, IUPUI
 2015: Andre Shinyashiki, Denver
 2016: Emmanuel Hamzat, Omaha
 2017: Jacob Stensson, Denver
 2018: Callum Stretch, Denver
 2019: Reed Berry, Oral Roberts
 2020: Hugo Kametani, Omaha

Coach of the Year 
 1984: Brian Doyle, Cleveland State
 1985: Cizo Mosnia, Eastern Illinois
 1986: Brian Doyle, Cleveland State
 1987: Cizo Mosnia, Eastern Illinois
 1988: Cizo Mosnia, Eastern Illinois
 1988: Tom Turner, Cleveland State
 1989: Cizo Mosnia, Eastern Illinois
 1990: Willy Roy, Northern Illinois
 1991: Steve Parker, Akron
 1992: Dave Poggi, Green Bay
 1993: Brian Doyle, Cleveland State
 1994: John Astudillo, Buffalo
 1995: John MacKenzie, Western Illinois
 1996: Mike Brown, UMKC
 1997: Mis’ Mrak, Valparaiso
 1998: Eric Johnson, Western Illinois
 1998: Mis’ Mrak, Valparaiso
 1999: Rick Benben, UMKC
 2000: Eric Johnson, Western Illinois
 2001: Rick Benben, UMKC
 2002: Mis’ Mrak, Valparaiso
 2003: Rick Benben, UMKC
 2004: Steve Hayes, Oral Roberts
 2005: Gary Parsons, Oakland
 2006: Eric Johnson, Western Illinois
 2007: Gary Parsons, Oakland
 2008: Gary Parsons, Oakland
 2009: Eric Pogue, Oakland
 2010: Rick Benben, UMKC
 2011: Eric Johnson, Western Illinois
 2012: Eric Pogue, Oakland
 2013: Bobby Muuss, Denver
 2014: Jason Mims, Oakland
 2015: Jamie Franks, Denver
 2016: Jamie Franks, Denver
 2017: Jamie Franks, Denver
 2018: Jamie Franks, Denver
 2019: Ryan Bush, Oral Roberts
 2020: Ryan Pore, Kansas City

References

External links 
 Summit League Men's Soccer

College soccer trophies and awards in the United States
Summit
Coach of the Year
Player of the Year
Awards established in 1984